King Faisal Hospital is an hospital in the Kacyiru area of the Rwandan capital Kigali. It was established between 1987 and 1991 with the help of the Saudi Fund for Development (SFD).  Being the largest referral hospital in Rwanda, King Faisal Hospital, Kigali spreads on 7.9 Hectares. It is located in an upscale area and has 18,000 square meters of floor space distributed over 4 floors and an extension building of 2,285 square meters of floor space. The hospital provides a range of highly specialized medical care, including diagnosis of diseases and specialized treatment.

Facilities

King Faisal Hospital, Kigali has 160 bed capacity. That includes 7 Intensive Care Unit (ICU) beds, 7 high-dependence unit beds, 5 operation theatres, 7 Neonatal Intensive Care Unit (NICU) beds, 13 beds in the emergency observation rooms and 2 fully equipped resuscitation rooms. The hospital also has a private wing with 8 high-end rooms, 2 of which are ICU rooms. With an average annual number of consultations of 72,201 patients and an average annual number of admissions of 8,346, the hospital has the region's lowest average length of stay of 5 days.

King Faisal Hospital Kigali acquired a Cath Lab (Catheterization lab) in November 2020. The laboratory will be in use for several procedures including diagnosing and treating certain cardiovascular conditions; carrying out coronary angioplasty (opening narrowed or blocked blood vessels that supply blood to the heart); coronary stenting (placing tube-shaped devices into the coronary arteries that supply blood to the heart to keep them open); as well as other interventions to correct blood flow, repair holes in the heart or locate blockages in blood vessels.

In December 2020, the hospital acquired a 1.5 Tesla MRI digital scanner. The MRI is of the latest technology. It provides higher resolution scans of the body's organs and tissues and allow better diagnosis. The hospital has the only CT scanner with a 128 slices capacity in the country as well as 13 haemodialysis machines.

As of September 2020, the hospital started a renovation and expansion project. The newly launched outpatient block comprises 45 new consultation rooms and an outpatient clinic that will be offering premium services. The first phase of the renovation project is focused on revamping the hospital's lobby and its private inpatient wing has been completed.

In the second quarter of 2021, our Obstetrics and Gynecology unit acquired a high-resolution ultrasound machine that will markedly improve the diagnostic accuracy for fetal anomalies in the first and second trimester of pregnancy. The new ultrasound machine delivers 3D and 4D imaging format allowing King Faisal Hospital to stay at the forefront of women's health imaging from routine women's health exams to complex imaging including fetal echocardiography.

Name Origin
The hospital was named after the King Faisal bin Abdulaziz Al Saud (April 1906–25 March 1975) who was a Saudi Arabian statesman, diplomat and King of Saudi Arabia from 2 November 1964 until his assassination in 1975, Prior to his ascension, he served as Crown Prince of Saudi Arabia from 9 November 1953 to 2 November 1964, and he was briefly regent to his half-brother King Saud in 1964, He was the third son of King Abdulaziz, the founder of modern Saudi Arabia, and the second of Abdulaziz's six sons who were kings.

Specialties
The hospital has invested in key medical specialties including cardiology, cardio-thoracic, neurosurgery, digestive surgery and orthopedics. Other specialties include nephrology, emergency medicine, pediatrics, oncology, gynecology and obstetrics, ENT, urology, pulmonology, dental and maxillofacial services, ophthalmology, dermatology, haematology, and pathology services.

With the arrival in January 2021 of a specialized adult nephrologist and one of the pioneers of kidney transplant in Sub-Saharan Africa, the hospital foresees starting a kidney transplant center towards the last quarter of 2021, that will be the very first in Rwanda.

Accreditation

King Faisal Hospital, Kigali is accredited by (COHSASA). COHSASA is an accrediting body based in Cape Town, South Africa that runs a healthcare accreditation which is also accredited by ISQua, the international society for Quality in healthcare.

King Faisal Hospital Rwanda Foundation (KFHRF)
The King Faisal Hospital Rwanda Foundation is currently at its beginning stage following an action plan that was approved by the hospital in October, 2020. Within the health domain, the Foundation's major objectives will be to support researchers through funding, training and facilitation in dissemination of research data, establishing strategic relationships with academic, research-driven and research sponsoring institutions and supporting training for medical researchers.
As part of a social welfare that constitutes an integral part of the foundation, the hospital will financially assist patients who cannot afford medical care and will continue to sensitize the public on NCDs, congenital and surgical diseases for prevention and early consultation. Furthermore, the foundation will support surgical camps/outreach within the country in a bid to reduce long waiting lists in teaching hospitals. 
Finally, within the education domain, the foundation will be promoting new learning tools including e-learning and support Continuing Medical Education (CME).

See also
List of hospitals in Rwanda
Health in Rwanda

References

External links
 King Faisal Hospital restructuring starts next month As of 8 February 2017.

 

Hospitals in Rwanda
Hospitals established in 1994
1994 establishments in Rwanda
Buildings and structures in Kigali